Oblik can refer to:
Oblik (mountain) in southern Serbia
Oblik (castle), medieval city in Montenegro
Stage name of British DJ Jake Williams